Xinjiang Xinxin Mining Industry Company, or in short form "Xinxin Mining" or "Xinxin", is the second largest electrolyted nickel in Mainland China. It has 30-year extraction rights of copper and nickel mines in Fuyun County, Xinjiang. Its products include nonferrous metals, cobalt, noble metals, gold, silver, platinum and palladium.

It was listed in the Hong Kong Stock Exchange on 12 October 2007.

External links
Xinjiang Xinxin Mining

Mining companies based in Xinjiang
Metal companies of China
Government-owned companies of China
Chinese companies established in 2005
Non-renewable resource companies established in 2005
H shares
Companies listed on the Hong Kong Stock Exchange
Altay Prefecture